David Alistair Kemp  (born 14 October 1941) is a retired Australian politician. He was a Liberal member of the Australian House of Representatives from March 1990 to October 2004, representing the Division of Goldstein, Victoria.

Early life and education
Kemp was born in Melbourne, Victoria, and was educated at the University of Melbourne and Yale University, where he gained a doctoral degree in politics. He is the brother of Senator Rod Kemp, and the son of Charles Denton Kemp, founder of the Institute of Public Affairs.

Career
Kemp was Senior Lecturer in Political Science at the University of Melbourne 1975–79 and Professor of Politics at Monash University, Melbourne 1979–90. He is the author of Society and Electoral Behaviour in Australia: a Study of Three Decades (1978), Malcolm Fraser on Australia (with D. M. White) (1986), Current Priorities for Liberalism (1986) and Foundations for Australian Political Analysis: Politics and Authority (1988).

Political career
Kemp was Senior Adviser to Malcolm Fraser, Leader of the Opposition and Prime Minister 1975–76 and Director of the Prime Minister's Office 1981.

In 1990 Kemp challenged Liberal MP and former Cabinet minister, Ian Macphee, for Liberal endorsement in the safe Melbourne seat of Goldstein. Kemp was seen as the candidate of the conservative wing of the Liberal Party, against a leading moderate liberal figure. Kemp won the battle.

Kemp was a member of the Opposition Shadow Ministry 1990–96. He was Minister for Schools, Vocational Education and Training, Minister Assisting the Prime Minister for the Public Service and Minister Assisting the Minister for Finance for Privatisation 1996–97. He was promoted to Cabinet as Minister for Employment, Education, Training and Youth Affairs  1997–98 and Minister for Education, Training and Youth Affairs 1998–2001. He was Minister for Environment and Heritage from November 2001 to July 2004. He was Vice-President of the Executive Council from October 1998 to July 2004. His brother Rod was a fellow minister.

David Kemp retired at the 2004 election.  He was succeeded as member for Goldstein by Andrew Robb.

In 2007, he was elected President of the Victorian Branch of the Liberal Party.  He retired in 2011 and was replaced as Liberal state President by Tony Snell.<ref

Post-political career
In 2012, Kemp became chairman of Scotch College, Melbourne. In 2017, Kemp was appointed a Companion of the Order of Australia for eminent service to the Parliament of Australia, notably in the areas of employment, education, training and youth affairs, to the environment, to institutional reform and public policy development, and to the community.

References

External links
Parliament of Australia biography
Liberal Party biography

1941 births
Living people
Liberal Party of Australia members of the Parliament of Australia
Members of the Cabinet of Australia
Members of the Australian House of Representatives for Goldstein
Members of the Australian House of Representatives
Companions of the Order of Australia
Academic staff of Monash University
University of Melbourne alumni
Academic staff of the University of Melbourne
Yale University alumni
Political science educators
Political science writers
People educated at Scotch College, Melbourne
21st-century Australian politicians
20th-century Australian politicians
Government ministers of Australia